An avalanche struck a road in Nyingchi at around 7:50 PM China Standard Time on 17 January 2023. Twenty-eight people were killed and 53 others were rescued, five of whom were seriously injured.

Local reports attributed the avalanche to high winds and warming temperatures, and identified most of the victims as travelers during the spring travel rush prior to the Chinese New Year. The affected road was between Pei, Tibet, and the exit of the  tunnel, in Medog County. Victims were trapped inside the tunnel and in their vehicles under snow and ice.

At least 1,348 rescuers and 236 pieces of equipment were deployed, digging a  path through waist-deep snow in rough terrain. Rescue operations concluded at 5:30 PM on 20 January.

See also
 Weather of 2023
 List of avalanches by death toll

References 

2020s avalanches
N
2023 disasters in China
January 2023 events in China
Natural disasters in Tibet
2023 in Tibet
Nyingchi